William Arnold Woodhouse (1857–1939) was an English artist.

His life and creative work
Woodhouse was born in Poulton le Sands, later the seaside town of Morecambe in Lancashire developed around this village. His parents also came from the same village. In 2001 one resident of Poulton discovered that Woodhouse had lived in his house in Poulton Road and there is now a wall mural on that house "as part of the Poulton Heritage Mural Trail". In 1892 after his marriage Woodhouse moved into a house in Chatsworth Road named Kenilcote. This house was designed by artist and featured in his oil painting The Reaper. In 1902 he and his wife moved again, this time into Auburn Court which was also a rural setting which inspired him in his work.

He specialized in animal portraits in the tradition of Landseer and was often praised for his artistic skill and realism. However, because he rarely travelled outside Lancashire, he did not achieve the full success or fame he deserved and is now mostly forgotten, even in the town of Morecambe itself. Many of his paintings have been sold at auction, among them was Pride of Place. It was sold at Bonhams Dogs in Show and Field in 2016 for $33,750.

He is buried with his wife and daughter at St. Peter's church in the village of Heysham, a little to the south of Morecambe.

Some of his paintings are on display in Lancaster City Museum in Lancaster and Lancaster Maritime Museum. William Woodhouse has had several gallery and museum exhibitions, including at the Chris Beetles Gallery.

His selected works
 Majestic, 1909, Lancaster City Museum
 Still Life, Zetland Ville Roses,  1920, Lancaster Maritime Museum
 Study of a Head, oil on canvas, Lancaster Maritime Museum
 Geraniums, oil on board, 1880–1939, Lancaster Maritime Museum
 Sailing Ships and Steamer, oil on canvas, Lancaster Maritime Museum
 Edith Emsley, oil on canvas, 1880–1939, Lancaster Maritime Museum
 Roy Woodhouse, oil on canvas,  1890, Lancaster Maritime Museum 
 Liver Spaniel with the Days Bag, oil on canvas
 Black and Tan Spaniel with the Days Bag, oil on canvas

References

Further reading
Accolade to an Artist: The Life and Work of William Woodhouse 1857-1939, Pam Corder-Birch, 2006.

External links
William Woodhouse at the Artchive Web Gallery
William Arnold Woodhouse at Burlington.co.uk
William Arnold Woodhouse at AskArt.com
Woodhouse paintings discovered at Heyshamheritage.org.uk

19th-century English painters
English male painters
20th-century English painters
1857 births
1939 deaths
People from Morecambe
Artists from Lancashire
20th-century English male artists
19th-century English male artists